KTEM (1400 AM), branded as "Newsradio 1400", is a radio station serving the Killeen-Temple, Texas, area with a News/Talk/Sports format. KTEM is under ownership of Townsquare Media, through licensee Townsquare Media Killeen-Temple License, LLC.  Its studios and transmitter are located separately in Temple.

References

External links
KTEM official website

TEM
News and talk radio stations in the United States
Townsquare Media radio stations
Radio stations established in 1936
1936 establishments in Texas